Kanyaadaanam is a 1976 Indian Malayalam film, directed by Hariharan and produced by C. C. Baby. The film stars Prem Nazir, Madhu, Sharada and Kaviyoor Ponnamma in the lead roles. The film has musical score by M. K. Arjunan. The film was a remake of Tamil film Padithaal Mattum Podhuma.

Cast
 
Prem Nazir 
Madhu 
Sharada 
Kaviyoor Ponnamma 
Adoor Bhasi 
Sankaradi 
Sreelatha Namboothiri 
Bahadoor 
Meena 
Nellikode Bhaskaran 
Tom John 
Vidhubala

Soundtrack
The music was composed by M. K. Arjunan and the lyrics were written by Sreekumaran Thampi.

References

External links
 

1976 films
1970s Malayalam-language films
Malayalam remakes of Tamil films
Films directed by Hariharan